The 1971 Los Angeles Dodgers finished the season in second place in the National League West.

Offseason 
 October 5, 1970: Ted Sizemore and Bob Stinson were traded by the Dodgers to the St. Louis Cardinals for Dick Allen.
 December 11, 1970: Alan Foster and Ray Lamb were traded by the Dodgers to the Cleveland Indians for Duke Sims.
 February 10, 1971: Andy Kosco was traded by the Dodgers to the Milwaukee Brewers for Al Downing.
 March 13, 1971: Jeff Torborg was purchased from the Dodgers by the California Angels.

Regular season

Season standings

Record vs. opponents

Opening Day lineup

Roster

Player stats

Batting

Starters by position 
Note: Pos = Position; G = Games played; AB = At bats; H = Hits; Avg. = Batting average; HR = Home runs; RBI = Runs batted in

Other batters 
Note: G = Games played; AB = At bats; H = Hits; Avg. = Batting average; HR = Home runs; RBI = Runs batted in

Pitching

Starting pitchers 
Note: G = Games pitched; IP = Innings pitched; W = Wins; L = Losses; ERA = Earned run average; SO = Strikeouts

Other pitchers 
Note: G = Games pitched; IP = Innings pitched; W = Wins; L = Losses; ERA = Earned run average; SO = Strikeouts

Relief pitchers 
Note: G = Games pitched; W = Wins; L = Losses; SV = Saves; ERA = Earned run average; SO = Strikeouts

Awards and honors 
Gold Glove Awards
Willie Davis
Wes Parker
Comeback Player of the Year Award
Al Downing

All-Stars 
1971 Major League Baseball All-Star Game
Willie Davis reserve
TSN National League All-Star
Willie Davis

Farm system

1971 Major League Baseball Draft

This was the seventh year of a Major League Baseball Draft.  The Dodgers drafted 55 players in the June draft and six in the January draft.

The only notable Major League player in this draft class was first round pick Rick Rhoden, a pitcher from Atlantic High School in Delray Beach, Florida. He pitched in the Majors from 1974–1989, the first five years with the Dodgers. He would have a record of 151–125 and was a two time all-star.

Notes

References 
Baseball-Reference season page
Baseball Almanac season page

External links 
1971 Los Angeles Dodgers uniform
Los Angeles Dodgers official web site

Los Angeles Dodgers seasons
Los Angeles Dodgers season
Los Angel